Karima Gouit is a Moroccan singer. Born 1 March 1992 in Marrakesh, Morocco she started her career as a model, but rose to popularity as a talent show contestant in the 8th season of Star Academy Arab World and O Ses Türkiye. She did not win either show.

Talent shows
In 2011 Gouit competed in the 8th season of Star Academy Arab World but left on the 6th prime of the show. She was nominated to leave on the first prime but was saved by the public's vote, then lost in the 6th prime, leaving the series.

Performances in Star Academy 8
 1st Prime : Ana f'intizarak Umm Kulthum
 2nd Prime : Fi youm we lila Warda Al-Jazairia
 3rd Prime : Tahwak Sofia El Marikh
 4th Prime : Ah ya helo Sabah Fakhri
 5th Prime : You gave me love Gilbert
 6th Prime : Ma aash meen za'alak Najwa Karam

O Ses Türkiye
In 2016 Gouit participated in the 7th season of O Ses Türkiye, singing "Qadoka lmayas" for her audition. She chose to be in Murat Boz's team, and won several rounds in the show but did not make it to the final.

Acting
She had a role in the Moroccan TV show Zinat al-Hayat, and appeared as the Egyptian Queen Arsinoe IV in the BBC's documentary Cleopatra: Portrait of a Killer (2009). She has also acted in a series of dramas based on the Gospels playing the role of Mary in 2014–16.

In 2013 Gouit won first place as the Moroccan ambassador of beauty and elegance.

Her first song was "Ya Hlilah" and released in 2015, her second "Hada Howa El maghrebi" featuring RedOne Berhil, Badr Soultan and Rikia Magha. Gouit's third song in 2016 was a video clip called "Mettalaa Hajbo".

References

Living people
21st-century Moroccan women singers
1992 births
People from Marrakesh